Samokhin is a Russian masculine surname, its feminine counterpart is Samokhina. It may refer to
Andrey Samokhin (born 1985), Kazakhstani wrestler
Anna Samokhina (1963–2010), Russian actress
Daria Samokhina (born 1992), Russian handballer
Gennady Samokhin (born 1971), Crimean speleologist 
Viktor Samokhin (1956–2022), Russian football player 
Fyodor Samokhin (1918–1992), was a Soviet-Russian novelist, member of the Union of writers of the USSR.
Russian-language surnames